Cégep de Matane is a francophone CEGEP pre-university and technical college located at 616 Saint-Rédempteur in Matane, Quebec, Canada.

Partnerships
The College of General and Vocational Education is affiliated with the ACCC, and CCAA.

History
In 1967, several institutions were merged and became public ones, when the Quebec system of CEGEPs was created.

Programs
The CEGEP offers two types of programs: pre-university and technical. The pre-university programs, which take two years to complete, cover the subject matters which roughly correspond to the additional year of high school given elsewhere in Canada in preparation for a chosen field in university. The technical programs, which take three-years to complete, applies to students who wish to pursue a skill trade. In addition Continuing education and services to business are provided.

Programmes préuniversitaires
Sciences de la nature
Sciences humaines
Arts et lettres
Programmes techniques
Gestion et exploitation d'entreprise agricole
Soins infirmiers
Technologie de l'électronique industrielle;
Techniques d'aménagement et d'urbanisme; de l'administration; de l'informatique; de tourisme;  de photographie; d'animation 3D et de synthèse d'images; d'intégration multimédia
Formation générale

See also
List of colleges in Quebec
Higher education in Quebec

References

External links

http://www.cegep-matane.qc.ca/

Matane
Matane
Buildings and structures in Bas-Saint-Laurent
Education in Bas-Saint-Laurent